The 2006–07 season was Stoke City's 100th in the Football League, the 40th in the second tier and third in the Championship.

With the return of Peter Coates and Tony Pulis the objective was to now gain a long-awaited return to the top flight of English football. Pulis was not a popular choice of manager amongst Stoke supporters and that feeling failed to be improved after a poor start to the season. But Coates provided Pulis with funds to spend on Danny Higginbotham,  Ricardo Fuller and several high-profile loan arrivals including Lee Hendrie, Liam Lawrence, Rory Delap, Salif Diao, Andy Griffin and Patrik Berger. Stoke marked a turn around in the direction of the club with a 4–0 win away at Leeds United. 

From then on Stoke produced a number of impressive performances as the side began to climb up the table. Stoke went into the final month of the season looking to claim a play-off spot but despite beating the likes of Leicester City and West Bromwich Albion frustrating draws against Cardiff City and Hull City meant that Stoke needed to win their final match away at Queens Park Rangers to have a chance of finishing 6th. It was not to be as a 1–1 was the result and City missed out on the play-offs by two points but it was a very positive season for the club.

Season review

League
With Peter Coates and Tony Pulis back at the Britannia Stadium the main objective was to challenge for a place in the Premier League. The first act Pulis was since returning as manager was to bring in French forward Vincent Péricard from the club he just left Plymouth Argyle. Despite Pulis expecting big things from him, Péricard failed to impress and is considered one of the worst players to play for the club by supporters. A more successful signing was that of Southampton defender Danny Higginbotham for £225,000. Stoke lost their first match of the season away at newly promoted Southend United but won their first home match 2–0 against a Derby County side tipped to be promoted. But after a woefully boring draw at home to Plymouth, Pulis was booed by the Stoke supporters. On transfer deadline Stoke completed the signing of Jamaican striker Ricardo Fuller for a fee of £500,000 and he would go on to have an eventful six-year career with the club. Pulis again took stick from supporters after seeing their side throw away a two-goal lead at Barnsley. However, despite the poor start to the season Coates remained in full support of Pulis.

To address the problem Stoke signed Aston Villa winger Lee Hendrie, Liverpool midfielder Salif Diao and Sunderland midfielder Rory Delap whilst Andy Griffin extended his loan deal. And in their first match away at crisis club Leeds United Stoke produced a fine display winning 4–0 which signalled a change in the direction of the club. Stoke won their next match against top of the table Sunderland but suffered a blow as Rory Delap broke his leg in two places. Stoke then beat Norwich City 5–0 and signed Sunderland winger Liam Lawrence. This combined with a five match winning run pushed Stoke up the table and after a 1–0 win against Queens Park Rangers goalkeeper Steve Simonsen made history by keeping seven successive clean sheets. But Stoke were brought back down to Earth with a bump, losing 3–0 away at Colchester United.

In the January transfer window, Stoke signed Lee Martin, Dominic Matteo, Gabriel Zakuani and Jonathan Fortune whilst captain Michael Duberry left for Reading leaving Higginbotham to take over as club captain. Stoke then went through a tough run of form winning just two from ten until the end of March before beating Leicester City to get their promotion push back on track. Stoke then beat West Bromwich Albion and Crystal Palace before frustrating draws against Cardiff City and Hull City prevented Stoke closing the gap on 6th place Southampton. Stoke won their penultimate match of the season 3–1 against Colchester United to set up a decisive encounter away at Queens Park Rangers. However Stoke produced a disappointing performance and could only draw 1–1 meaning that they missed out on a play-off place by two points. Despite failing to reach the play-offs the feeling was greatly improved around the club for quite a while and there were high hopes Stoke could go one better in 2007–08 and finally gain promotion back to the top tier.

League Cup
Stoke kept up their poor showing in the first round of the League Cup this time in a truly woeful defeat against League Two Darlington. Stoke, at home, took the lead through Vincent Péricard after half an hour before Darlington were reduced to ten men. With a man advantage against poor opposition the expectation was to see out a routine win but Darlington scored twice without replay leaving Stoke and manager Pulis embarrassed.

FA Cup
Two late goals saw Stoke see off League One Millwall in the third round to set up an away match against Fulham but Stoke were easily beaten 3–0.

Final league table

Results
Stoke's score comes first

Legend

Pre-Season Friendlies

Football League Championship

FA Cup

League Cup

Squad statistics

References

Stoke City F.C. seasons
Stoke City